The Twisp River is a tributary of the Methow River, in the U.S. state of Washington. It is about 26 miles (42 km) long. The name of the river comes from the Okanagan placename [txwə́c’p], perhaps meaning "wasp" or "yellowjacket".

Course
The Twisp River originates in the North Cascades portion of the Cascade Range. Flowing generally east, the Twisp River drains the mountains south of Washington Pass as well as the eastern slopes of Sawtooth Ridge, a major mountain range with some of Washington state's highest peaks (such as Star Peak and Mt Bigelow).

The Twisp River flows into the Methow River at the town of Twisp, Washington.

Trivia
A Japanese incendiary balloon was reported on the Twisp River in 1945.

Tributaries
(In order of Source to Mouth)
North Fork Twisp River
South Fork Twisp River

Left
North Creek
Scatter Creek
Whistling Creek
Little Slate Creek
Cook Creek
lime Creek
Canyon Creek
Bridge Creek
Coal Creek
Myer Creek

Right
South Creek
Reynolds Creek
Williams Creek
War Creek
Eagle Creek
Scaffold Creek
Buttermilk Creek
Newby Creek
Poorman Creek

See also
List of rivers of Washington
Tributaries of the Columbia River

References

Rivers of Washington (state)
Rivers of Okanogan County, Washington